Rissoa gomerica is a species of minute sea snail, a marine gastropod mollusc or micromollusc in the family Rissoidae.

Description

Distribution
This species occurs in the North Atlantic Ocean.

References

 Nordsieck F. & Garcia-Talavera F., 1979: Moluscos marinos de Canarias y Madera (Gastropoda) ; * Aula de Cultura de Tenerife 208 pp., 46 pl.
 Gofas, S.; Le Renard, J.; Bouchet, P. (2001). Mollusca. in: Costello, M.J. et al. (Ed.) (2001). European register of marine species: a check-list of the marine species in Europe and a bibliography of guides to their identification. Collection Patrimoines Naturels. 50: pp. 180–213

External links
 

Rissoidae
Gastropods described in 1979